Allogona profunda, commonly known as the broad-banded forestsnail, is a species of air-breathing land snail, a terrestrial pulmonate gastropod mollusk in the family Polygyridae.

The broad-banded forestsnail is roughly 15 millimeters in height, and about twice as wide. Its shell is helix-shaped. Its body is gray, usually a lighter shade, and many specimens have a red stripe on their shells.

Habitat and distribution 

The broad-banded forestsnail is found in forests. It primarily lives on the floors of floodplains and related habitats. Like related species, it is believed to primarily eat fungi, and therefore it is attracted to log mold. It is distributed throughout North America; specifically in the United States and Canada.

References 

Polygyridae
Gastropods described in 1821